SunExpress, is a Turkish-German airline based in Antalya. SunExpress was founded in October 1989 as a joint venture between Turkish Airlines and Lufthansa. It operates scheduled and chartered passenger flights to 90 destinations in 30 countries in Europe as well as North Africa,  the Mediterranean, Black Sea, and Red Sea. The airline concentrates on international tourism, domestic Turkish flights to cities in Anatolia, and wet leasing. The total number of SunExpress employees is 5,000.

History
 

SunExpress was founded in Antalya in October 1989 as a joint venture of Turkish Airlines and Lufthansa. Its first flight was in 1990.

SunExpress became the first private airline company to offer international scheduled flights from Turkey with its first Antalya-Frankfurt flight in 2001. SunExpress opened its second base in İzmir and started to operate domestic flights in 2006. With this launch, SunExpress became the first airline company to connect İzmir with Anatolian cities with direct flights in Turkey.

In May 2010, SunExpress took delivery of the first of six newly purchased Boeing 737-800s and launched its new corporate identity including its new logo, aircraft livery, new corporate colours, uniforms and visual identity elements.

SunExpress Deutschland GmbH was founded in 2011. The company started business operations in June 2011. Besides the Turkish destinations on the South Coast, on the Aegean, on the Black Sea and in the East of the country, it also serves – with German registration – destinations along the Mediterranean, Black Sea, North Africa and Red Sea.

SunExpress decided to invest in its building and SunExpress Plaza was built in June 2012. The new company building is environmental friendly, and is located in a natural setting. The architectural theme of the building is transparency and naturalness; therefore each room has been designed so that it has access to natural light and fresh air. The sun is a source for clean energy inside the building. The solar panels on the roof generate enough electricity to supply power to all of the computers. On the exterior of the building, “smart” glass panels have been used to allow sun rays to shine inside the building while blocking out unwanted heat to help reduce cooling costs. Orange, bergamot, and lemon trees have been planted in both the interior and exterior gardens. The building consists of 1 basement and 4 floors which house 250 SunExpress employees in 87 offices. There are several special category spaces incorporating meeting, briefing, training, storage, and various special operation rooms. The building also hosts common archive room, a stationary flight simulator room and a general purpose auditorium.

On 23 June 2020, it has been announced that SunExpress' German subsidiary SunExpress Deutschland would cease operations and be liquidated. Its route network would be partially taken over by SunExpress and Eurowings.

Destinations
SunExpress serves the following destinations as of February 2021:

Fleet

As of 12th July 2022, the SunExpress fleet consists of the following aircraft:

References

External links

SunExpress official website 

Turkish companies established in 1989
Turkish brands
Airlines established in 1989
Airlines of Turkey
Charter airlines
Lufthansa Group
Turkish Airlines